Sean Keppie (born 20 May 1998) is an Australian professional rugby league footballer who plays as a  for the Manly Warringah Sea Eagles in the NRL.

Background
Keppie played his junior rugby league for the Narellan Jets in the Group 6 Junior Rugby League.

Playing career
Keppie made his NRL debut for Manly against the Parramatta Eels in round 25 of the 2019 NRL season at Bankwest Stadium.
Keppie then featured in both of Manly's finals games in the 2019 finals series as Manly reached the second week until they were eliminated by South Sydney in the semi-finals.

Keppie played 19 games for Manly-Warringah in the 2020 NRL season as they finished 13th on the table.

Keppie played 20 games for Manly in the 2021 NRL season including the club's preliminary final loss against South Sydney.

References

External links
Manly Warringah Sea Eagles profile

1998 births
Living people
Australian rugby league players
Manly Warringah Sea Eagles players
Rugby league players from Sydney
Rugby league props